Wilfrid J. Turba (January 18, 1928 – August 18, 2005) was a member of the Wisconsin State Assembly.

Biography
Turba was born on January 18, 1928, in Russell, Sheboygan County, Wisconsin. He was the valedictorian of the 1945 graduating class of New Holstein High School. Turba then attended the University of Wisconsin–Madison. Turba was a dairy and grain farmer. Later, he became a lector and choir member of St. Ann's Roman Catholic Church in St. Anna, Wisconsin.

On May 2, 1950, Turba married Leona Boll. They would have nine children together. Leona died on December 28, 1995. On December 30, 1996, he married Mary Jane Fellenz-Brunmeier, a mother of two. Turba died on August 18, 2005, in Elkhart Lake, Wisconsin.

Political career
Turba was a member of the Assembly from 1982 to 1992. Additionally, he served as President of the New Holstein, Wisconsin School Board. He was a Republican.

References

People from Sheboygan County, Wisconsin
People from New Holstein, Wisconsin
Farmers from Wisconsin
Republican Party members of the Wisconsin State Assembly
School board members in Wisconsin
University of Wisconsin–Madison alumni
1928 births
2005 deaths
20th-century American politicians